Canning Purba Assembly constituency is a Legislative Assembly constituency of South 24 Parganas district in the Indian State of West Bengal.

Overview
As per order of the Delimitation Commission in respect of the Delimitation of constituencies in the West Bengal, Canning Purba (Bidhan Sabha constituency) is composed of the following:
 Deuli I, Deuli II, Kalikatala, Matherdighi, Sarengabad, Tambuldaha I and Tambuldaha II gram panchayats of Canning II community development block
 Bodra, Chandaneswar I, Chandaneswar II, Durgapur, Sanksahar and Tardah gram panchayats of Bhangar I community development block

Canning Purba (Bidhan Sabha constituency) is a part of No. 19 Jaynagar (Lok Sabha constituency).

Members of Legislative Assembly

Election Results

Legislative Assembly Election 2021

Legislative Assembly Election 2016

Legislative Assembly Election 2011

Legislative Assembly Elections 1977-2006
Abdur Razzak Molla of CPI(M) has represented the Canning Purba Assembly constituency from 1977 to 2006. He defeated his nearest rivals, Amirul Islam of AITC in 2006, Mujibar Rahman Kayal of INC in 2001, Akram Laskar of INC in 1996, Abdus Sattar Molla of INC in 1991, Amar Nath Bandopadhyay of INC in 1987, Ahammad Nuruzzaman of INC in 1982 and Osman Gani of INC in 1977.

Legislative Assembly Elections 1957-1972
Gobinda Chandra Naskar of INC won the Canning Assembly constituency in 1972 and 1971. Narayan Naskar of INC won in 1969. A.C.Halder of Bangla Congress won in 1967. Khagendra Nath Naskar of INC won in 1962. In 1957, Canning Assembly constituency had joint seats. Khagendra Nath Naskar and Abdus Shukur, both of INC, won. The seat did not exist prior to that.

References

Notes

Citations

Assembly constituencies of West Bengal
Politics of South 24 Parganas district